Košarkaški klub Belišće is a Croatian professional basketball club based in a town of Belišće.

External links
Official Website

Basketball teams in Croatia
Basketball teams established in 1974
Basketball teams in Yugoslavia